Gaianes is a municipality in the comarca of Comtat, Alicante, Valencia, Spain.

Main sights
 Gayanes Castle, small castle in charge of the vigilance of the Serpis river. It is possible to observe the principal tower and some parts of the old walls. Nowadays it is in ruins.
 Gayanes Town Hall, located in a former manor house close to the church.
 San Jaime Apostol Church, building of architectural interest. Built in 1526 on the site of a mosque.
 San Francisco de Paula Hermitage, dates back of beginning of the 18th century. In the local holidays, the pilgrimage is realized on Sunday to the hermitage, being an emotive act and taking the Saint Francisco de Paula's image.

Natural areas 
 Albufera of Gayanes, a lagoon located in Gayanes, natural space for the biodiversity of flora and fauna.
 Benicadell, a mountainous formation in whose skirts Gayanes is situated. It is placed in the Serra Mariola Natural Park, between the provinces of Alicante and Valencia.
 Serpis River, that across Gayanes.
 Green route of the Serpis River, a route by the former tracing of the Ferrocarril Alcoy Gandia constructed in 1892, to his step along Gayanes.

References

External links 

 Gayanes Town Hall Website 

Gayanes
Municipalities in the Province of Alicante
Comtat